Mutu, or Tuam (Mutu-Tuam), is an Austronesian languages of Morobe Province, Papua New Guinea.

References

External links 
 

Ngero languages
Languages of Morobe Province